African Americans and their skin color and hair were once considered unattractive by white people. Black women and their bodies have been devalued and rejected by white ideal beauty standards.

Lead 
African American beauty focuses on the beauty of African Americans, as beauty is viewed differently by various groups. Similar to other cultures, ideals of beauty in African-American communities have varied throughout the years. Influenced by the racial perspectives on beauty, lighter skin tones and straight hair have been considered desirable characteristics by different groups, including African Americans.

History
Racialized perspectives on beauty which led to lighter skin tones being considered desirable characteristics by different groups including African Americans can be traced back to slavery. The view of lighter skin tones as the ideal beauty standard are linked to colorism, which affects African Americans perceptions of themselves, with African women being disproportionately affected.

Beauty Standards 
Despite some similarities between how African Americans and other groups view beauty, African Americans also view beauty as seen in body ideals as not being limited to one specific type that has been portrayed in the media. This view of beauty transcends the physical perception of beauty and recognizes that beauty is not limited to physical characteristics only.

Hair 
African Americans hair is politicized, and this affects how African Americans choose to wear their hair as there is no way to know how it will be perceived, and the treatment that will arise from this.

Effects of beauty standards 
Similar to other minority groups, African Americans have been subject to Western beauty ideals which portray slim body types as the standard to aspire to. The portrayal of slim body types as the ideal in Western beauty ideals has been linked to various eating disorders. There have been limited studies that show the effects of Western beauty ideals and the resulting eating disorders amongst African Americans.

Media 
African American beauty takes into consideration the intersectionality of African Americans and how this intersectionality has affected the representation of African Americans in media, which plays a significant role in communicating what society's beauty standards are.

Portrayals of straight hair in the media have set a beauty standard which is exclusionary of the different hair textures of African Americans. Despite the role played by media in setting beauty standards for hair, social media has provided a platform for African Americans who are progressing beauty standards by wearing their hair in different states, including its natural state.

See also 
African-American hair
 Black is Beautiful

References

Beauty
African-American culture